Tirana 2 is one of the 24 administrative units in Tirana.

Neighborhoods
Qyteti Student

References

Tirana 02